Birrell is an English surname. Notable people with the surname include:

Adrian Birrell (born 1960), former South African first class cricketer, Irish cricket coach
Alec Birrell (1885–1948), Australian rules footballer
Augustine Birrell (1850–1933), English politician, barrister, academic and author
Billy Birrell (1897–1968), Scottish football player and manager
Bob Birrell (footballer) (1890–1956), Scottish footballer
Frederick Ronald Birrell (1913–1985), South Australian unionist and MHR
Frederick William Birrell (1869–1939), South Australian typographer and MLA
Gerry Birrell (1944–1973), Scottish racing driver
Harry Birrell (1928–2013), American news reporter
Harry Birrell (cricketer) (1927–2003), South African cricketer and schoolmaster
James Birrell (born 1928), retired architect who worked in Queensland, Australia
John Birrell (1815–1875), railway entrepreneur
Kimberly Birrell (born 1998), Australian tennis player
Mark Birrell (born 1958), solicitor, director, former Cabinet Minister in Victoria, Australia
Niki Birrell (born 1986), British Paralympic sailor
Peter Birrell (born 1941), British musician in the band, Freddie and the Dreamers
Willie Birrell (1893–1968), Scottish footballer

English-language surnames